Ahmed Sherweda (born 21 October 1990) is an Egyptian football striker who plays for Egyptian Premier League side Haras El Hodoud as well as the Egyptian national team.

He has been called up for Egypt for the first time in 2011 for two games against Niger and Sierra Leone. He was called up again for the national team in 2014 for a friendly game against Jamaica.

References

External links
Egypt - Ahmed Sherweda - Profile with news, career statistics and history - Soccerway

Egyptian footballers
Egypt international footballers
Association football forwards
1990 births
Living people
Al Masry SC players
Telephonat Beni Suef SC players
Al Ittihad Alexandria Club players
ENPPI SC players
El Entag El Harby SC players
Nogoom FC players
Haras El Hodoud SC players